Crown Legacy FC is an American professional soccer team that is located in Matthews, North Carolina. It is the reserve team of Charlotte FC and participates in MLS Next Pro.

History 

On March 31, 2022, Charlotte FC announced it would field an MLS Next Pro team under the leadership of president Darrius Barnes. The club had previously affiliated with the Charlotte Independence of USL League One for the 2022 season. The team was one of seven MLS-affiliated clubs that would join MLS Next Pro in 2023.

The club's name, Crown Legacy FC, and circular logo were announced in January 2023 following a delay due to the death of Charlotte FC defender Anton Walkes. The inaugural season is scheduled to begin on March 26.

Stadium

Crown Legacy FC will play their home matches at the Mecklenburg County Sportsplex in Matthews, North Carolina. The complex's main stadium has a capacity of 5,000 spectators. Charlotte FC has trained at the facility since 2022.

Players and staff

Current roster 
{| class="wikitable sortable"
|-
! style="background-color:#0082CA; color:#FFFFFF; border:2px solid #000000;" scope="col"|No.
! style="background-color:#0082CA; color:#FFFFFF; border:2px solid #000000;" scope="col"|Pos.
! style="background-color:#0082CA; color:#FFFFFF; border:2px solid #000000;" scope="col"|Player
! style="background-color:#0082CA; color:#FFFFFF; border:2px solid #000000;" scope="col"|Nation
|-

Staff

References

External links 
 

Association football clubs established in 2022
2022 establishments in North Carolina
Charlotte FC
Soccer clubs in North Carolina
Reserve soccer teams in the United States
MLS Next Pro teams